The discography of Maki Ohguro, a  Japanese J-pop singer and songwriter, consists of 15 studio albums and 37 singles.

Albums

Studio albums

Compilation albums

Cover albums

Reissue albums

Singles

As lead artist

As featured artist

Promotional singles

DVDs

References

Discographies of Japanese artists
Pop music discographies